Yu Huan ( third century) was a historian of the state of Cao Wei during the Three Kingdoms period of China.

Life
Yu Huan was from Jingzhao Commandery, which is around present-day Xi'an, Shaanxi. He is best known for writing the Weilüe and Dianlüe, which according to the Book of Sui, are composed of 33 and 89 volumes respectively. The Old Book of Tang listed 38 volumes of the Weilüe and 50 volumes of the Dianlüe, while the New Book of Tang 58 listed the Weilüe as containing 50 volumes.

Neither of these works are extant, however a volume of the Weilüe was quoted as an extensive footnote to the Records of the Three Kingdoms in the (30th) section on the Wuhuan, Xianbei and Dongyi by Pei Songzhi during the fifth century. It served as an additional guide to the Western Regions on the book. The volume has only survived because it was included as an extensive note to Records of the Three Kingdoms.

According to the Shitong, Yu Huan was at one time the mayor of Luoyang, the capital of the Cao Wei state (220-265). Although it seems he never left China, he collected a large amount of information on the countries to the west of China including Parthia, India, the Roman Empire and the various routes to them. Some of this information had reached China well before Yu Huan's time, and can also be found in the sections dealing with the Western Regions of the Records of the Grand Historian,  the Book of Han, and/or the Book of the Later Han.

In spite of the inclusion of earlier (and sometimes fanciful) information, the Weilüe contains much new, unique and generally trustworthy material. Most of it dates from the late second and early third centuries. It is this new information that makes the Weilüe such a valuable source. Much of it appears to date from the Eastern Han dynasty, before China was largely cut off from the West by civil wars and unrest along its borders during the late 2nd century CE.

See also
 Lists of people of the Three Kingdoms

References

External links
 The Weilüe in The Peoples of the West, translation by John E. Hill

Year of birth unknown
Year of death unknown
Chinese travel writers
Cao Wei historians
3rd-century Chinese historians
Writers from Xi'an
Jin dynasty (266–420) historians
Historians from Shaanxi